Peter Zobl-Wessely (born 12 July 1949) is an Austrian modern pentathlete and épée fencer. He competed as a modern pentathlete at the 1972 Summer Olympics and as a fencer at the 1976 Summer Olympics.

References 

1949 births
Living people
Austrian male épée fencers
Austrian male modern pentathletes
Olympic fencers of Austria
Olympic modern pentathletes of Austria
Modern pentathletes at the 1972 Summer Olympics
Fencers at the 1976 Summer Olympics
People from Mistelbach
Sportspeople from Lower Austria